Slaven Kovačević (Cyrillic: Славен Ковачевић; born 17 June 1980) is a Montenegrin football manager and former player.

Playing career
He played as midfielder with FK Željezničar Sarajevo in the Premier League of Bosnia and Herzegovina. Earlier he played with FK Zemun in the Serbian SuperLiga.

Managerial career
He finished his playing career at FK Palilulac Beograd in Serbian League Belgrade and, afterwards, became coach. He started his coaching career in 2017 taking charge of FK Lokomotiva Železnik, and, later he also coached FK Radnički Obrenovac and FK BSK Borča.

References

1980 births
Living people
Footballers from Podgorica
Association football midfielders
Serbia and Montenegro footballers
Montenegrin footballers
FK Budućnost Podgorica players
FK Radnički Beograd players
FK Železničar Beograd players
FK Zemun players
Serbian SuperLiga players
FK Čukarički players
OFK Mladenovac players
FK Voždovac players
FK Bežanija players
OFK Petrovac players
FK Željezničar Sarajevo players
FK Palilulac Beograd players
First League of Serbia and Montenegro players
Second League of Serbia and Montenegro players
Montenegrin First League players
Premier League of Bosnia and Herzegovina players
Montenegrin expatriate footballers
Expatriate footballers in Serbia
Montenegrin expatriate sportspeople in Serbia
Expatriate footballers in Bosnia and Herzegovina
Montenegrin expatriate sportspeople in Bosnia and Herzegovina
Montenegrin football managers
FK BSK Borča managers
Montenegrin expatriate football managers
Expatriate football managers in Serbia